Connemara is a locality in Alberta, Canada within Foothills County. The locality takes its name from Connemara, in Ireland.

References 

Localities in Foothills County